The Battle of Antioch (1098) was a military engagement fought between the Christian forces of the First Crusade and a Muslim coalition led by Kerbogha, atabeg of Mosul. Kerbogha's goal was to reclaim Antioch from the Crusaders and affirm his position as a regional power.

The conflict begins 
As the starving and outnumbered Crusaders emerged from the gates of the city and divided into six regiments, Kerbogha's commander, Watthab ibn Mahmud, urged him to immediately strike their advancing line. However, Kerbogha was concerned a preemptive strike might only destroy the Crusader's front line and may also significantly weaken his own forces disproportionately. However, as the French continued to advance against the Turks, Kerbogha began to grasp the severity of the situation (he previously underestimated the size of the Crusading army), and attempted to establish an embassy between him and the Crusaders in order to broker a truce. However, it was too late for him, and the leaders of the Crusade ignored his emissary.

Battle manoeuvres 
Kerbogha, now backed against a corner by the advancing French, opted to adopt a more traditional Turkish battle tactic. He would attempt to back his army up slightly in order to drag the French into unsteady land, while continuously pelting the line with horse archers, meanwhile making attempts to outflank the French. However, Bohemond of Taranto was ready for this, and he created a seventh division of Crusaders led by Rainald III of Toul to hold off the attack. Soon, many Emirs began to desert Kerbogha. Many of the Crusaders were also encouraged by the presumed visions of St. George, St. Mercurius, and Saint Demetrius among their ranks. Finally, Duqaq, ruler of Damascus, deserted, spreading panic among the ranks of the Turks. Sökmen and the emir of Homs, Janah ad-Dawla, were the last loyal to Kerbogha, but they too soon deserted after realizing the battle was lost. The whole Turkish army was now in complete disarray, all fleeing in different directions; the Crusaders chased them as far as the Iron Bridge, slaying many of them. Kerbogha would go on to return to Mosul, defeated and stripped of his prestige.

References

Bibliography 
 
 
 
 
 

First Crusade
1098 in Asia
History of Antioch
Conflicts in 1098